Apo station  is a railway station located in Gimcheon, South Korea, along the Gyeongbu Line.

Railway stations in North Gyeongsang Province